Joseph Thomas Jones (9 January 1887 – 23 July 1941) was a Welsh footballer who played in the Football League for Stoke, Crystal Palace, Coventry City and Crewe Alexandra. He also made 15 appearances for the Wales national team.

Career
Jones, who was born in Rhosymedre, Wales, was one of a select band of footballers who appeared for a club before, during and after the First World War. Jones spent ten years with Stoke making almost 130 senior appearances and 133 during the war. Described as a solid uncompromising, yet bustling-type of a defender with a fantastic heading ability who had a great enthusiasm for the game. He became captain for both club and country, and helped Stoke to re-gain their English Football League status in 1914–15 and also finish runners-up of the Lancashire Football section in 1917–18 and 1918–19 before leaving to join Crystal Palace. At Palace he helped the club become champions of the Third Division, in its inaugural season in 1920–21, making 25 appearances and scoring four goals. After a further 36 appearances ( two goals) the next season, he moved on to Coventry City in July 1922 and subsequently to Crewe Alexandra.

After heading a ball Jones lost his sight in one eye causing him to retire. He later ran a snooker hall and a bookshop for the blind before his death in 1941.

Career statistics

Club
Source:

International
Source:

References

1887 births
1941 deaths
Welsh footballers
Wales international footballers
Crewe Alexandra F.C. players
Crystal Palace F.C. players
Coventry City F.C. players
Stoke City F.C. players
Wrexham A.F.C. players
English Football League players
Association football defenders
Treharris Athletic Western F.C. players